Hannah Reji Koshy is an Indian actress and model from Kerala. She made her acting debut in 2016 with the Malayalam film Darvinte Parinamam. She was one of the Top 6 finalists of Miss India South, an Indian associated Beauty pageant. She also competed in Miss Diva: Miss Universe India 2018 and finished as a Top 5 finalist.

Early life
Hannah hails from the city Kochi of Kerala. Apart from being an Actress, she is a professional model who created her appearance in various beauty pageants. Hannah completed her schooling from Assisi Vidyaniketan and graduated from Sharavathi Dental College from Karnataka. She was also seen essaying the main role in a video titled Living Nirbhaya which was released on 8 March (International Women's Day). Hannah is a dentist.

Career

Films
Hannah made her debut to the Malayalam film industry in 2016 through the film Darvinte Parinamam which is directed by Jijo Antony. She portrayed the role of Ancy, a simple and traditional girl carrying the supporting role in the film, co-starred with Prithviraj Sukumaran. The film released on 18 March 2016. In the following year she starred in Rakshadhikari Baiju Oppu, in which she played the wife of title character Baiju played by Biju Menon. The film won Kerala State Film Award for Best Film with Popular Appeal and Aesthetic Value.

Modelling
Hannah competed in Miss South India and was one of the Top 6 Finalist. She later on competed in Miss Diva - 2018  which is the sister pageant of Femina Miss India. The Winner of Miss Diva will represent India at World's Biggest beauty pageant Miss Universe. She was one of the Top 5 finalist at Miss Diva - 2018.

 Miss Beautiful Skin – Miss Queen Of India 2015
 Miss Moksha 2012
 Miss Personality – Manappuram Miss South India 2015
 Miss Cat Walk – Femina Miss Kerala
 Miss Diva - 2018 – Miss Congeniality

Filmography

*All films are in Malayalam language unless otherwise noted.

References

External links

Living people
Indian film actresses
Actresses from Kochi
Actresses in Malayalam cinema
21st-century Indian actresses
Malayali people
Year of birth missing (living people)